Sunapati is a Rural municipality located within the Ramechhap District of the Bagmati Province of Nepal.
The municipality spans  of area, with a total population of 18,141 according to a 2011 Nepal census.

On March 10, 2017, the Government of Nepal restructured the local level bodies into 753 new local level structures.
The previous Dimipokhari, Hiledevi, Bethan, Khaniyapani and small portion of Gunsi Bhadaure VDCs were merged to form Sunapati Rural Municipality.
Sunapati is divided into 5 wards, with Hiledevi declared the administrative center of the rural municipality.

Demographics
At the time of the 2011 Nepal census, Sunapati Rural Municipality had a population of 18,148. Of these, 52.6% spoke Nepali, 34.6% Tamang, 11.2% Newar, 0.6% Majhi,  0.4% Magar, 0.3% Doteli, 0.1% Maithili, 0.1% Yolmo and 0.1% other languages as their first language.

In terms of ethnicity/caste, 34.9% were Tamang, 20.1% Chhetri, 17.3% Newar, 9.4% Hill Brahmin, 9.2% Magar, 2.5% Kami, 2.1% Damai/Dholi, 2.0% Majhi, 1.0% Sarki and 1.5% others.

In terms of religion, 63.7% were Hindu, 35.3% Buddhist, 0.7% Christian and 0.3% others.

References

External links
official website of the rural municipality

Rural municipalities in Ramechhap District
Rural municipalities of Nepal established in 2017